Idan Cohen may refer to:

 Idan Cohen (choreographer) (born 1978), Israeli choreographer and opera director
 Idan Cohen (footballer) (born 1996), Israeli soccer player